Wabash Avenue is a 1950 American musical film directed by Henry Koster and starring Betty Grable. The film was a remake of Grable's earlier hit 1943 film Coney Island.

Plot
Ruby Summers (Betty Grable) is a burlesque queen in a successful dance hall in 1892 Chicago. The owner of the dance hall Mike (Phil Harris) has cheated his ex-partner Andy Clark (Victor Mature) out of a half interest in the business. Andy schemes to potentially ruin Mike and also hopes to make Ruby a classy entertainer, as well as his own girl.

Cast

 Betty Grable as Ruby Summers
 Victor Mature as Andy Clark
 Phil Harris as Mike Stanley
 Reginald Gardiner as English Eddie
 James Barton as Harrigan
 Barry Kelley as Bouncer
 Margaret Hamilton as Tillie Hutch
 Jacqueline Dalya as Cleo
 Robin Raymond as Jennie
 Hal K. Dawson as Healy
 Dorothy Neumann as Reformer
 Alexander Pope as Charlie Saxe
 Henry Kulky as Joe Barton
 Marie Bryant as Elsa
 Collette Lyons as Beulah
 George Beranger as Wax Museum Attendant

Background
Wabash Avenue, named from a major Chicago street, was reportedly conceived as a biopic of Chicago songwriter Gus Kahn.  Negotiations dissolved but exhibitors had been promised that title so 20th Century Fox hastily substituted a rewrite of its 1943 Coney Island.  (The Kahn biopic was made at Warner Bros. in 1951 as I'll See You in My Dreams, with Danny Thomas as Kahn.)

The film became a vehicle for Betty Grable with Richard Widmark and Paul Douglas to co-star. The setting was to be the 1893 Chicago Exposition. Eventually Widmark was replaced by Victor Mature. Eventually Paul Douglas dropped out and was replaced by Phil Harris.

Filming started on 9 May 1949. It was the first in a three-picture contract Koster had with Fox.

The film featured five new numbers in addition to some old favourites. 87 sets were constructed included a recreation of Wabash Avenue.

Grable enjoyed working with director Henry Koster so much she insisted he direct her next film, My Blue Heaven.

Awards
Wabash Avenue also received an Academy Award nomination for Best Original Song for the number Wilhelmina.

References

External links
 
 
 
 
 

1950 films
Films directed by Henry Koster
1950s romantic musical films
Films set in Chicago
Films set in the 1890s
Films with screenplays by Charles Lederer
1950s English-language films
American romantic musical films
20th Century Fox films
Films produced by William Perlberg
1950s American films